The MySky MS One is an American light-sport aircraft, designed and produced by MySky Aircraft of Port Orange, Florida. The aircraft was introduced at AirVenture in 2009. The MS One is supplied as a complete ready-to-fly-aircraft.

Design and development

The aircraft was designed to comply with the US light-sport aircraft rules. It features a cantilever low-wing, a two-seats-in-tandem enclosed cockpit under a bubble canopy, fixed tricycle landing gear and a single engine in tractor configuration.

The MS One is made from composites. The standard engine available is the  Jabiru 3300 four-stroke powerplant, although engines of up to  can be fitted. The airframe was engineered for +/-10g.

The original intention was to have the design as an accepted LSA in 2010, but plans were delayed by the economic situation. As of February 2017, the design does not appear on the Federal Aviation Administration's list of approved special light-sport aircraft.

Specifications (MS One)

References

External links

Light-sport aircraft
Single-engined tractor aircraft